Freiburg is one of the four Regierungsbezirke of Baden-Württemberg, Germany, located in the south-west of the country. It covers the Black Forest (Schwarzwald) hills as well as the Rhine valley. It is sub-divided into the three regions (Regionalverband) Hochrhein-Bodensee, Schwarzwald-Baar-Heuberg and Südlicher Oberrhein. It is divided into nine districts and 294 municipalities.

Economy 
The Gross domestic product (GDP) of the region was 86.9 billion € in 2018, accounting for 2.6% of German economic output. GDP per capita adjusted for purchasing power was €35,300  or 117% of the EU27 average in the same year. The GDP per employee was 97% of the EU average.

References

External links 
 

 
Geography of Baden-Württemberg
Government regions of Germany
NUTS 2 statistical regions of Germany